The many local councils have gone through thousands of name changes, merges, splits and re-creations since the establishment of the Boy Scouts of America in 1910.

List of defunct local councils of the Boy Scouts of America

See also
 Council shoulder patch
 History of the Boy Scouts of America
 Local council camps of the Boy Scouts of America

Notes

References

External links

 
 
 

 
BSA local councils and districts
Scouting-related lists